= City of Chaos =

Board game

City of Chaos is a board game that was published by Monocle Games in 1996.

== Gameplay ==
City of Chaos, designed by Martyn Oliver and Colin Thornton, combines a board game with elements of fantasy role-playing. The game is set in Byronitar, "City of Chaos", whose inhabitants are threatened by forces of entropy.

=== Purpose ===
The players must save the city from destruction.

=== Components ===
The following components are included:

- tiles, which are added to the table one at a time to make up the map of the city
- skull-head tokens
- playing cards
- a book titled "Tome of Chaos"
- pewter miniatures

=== Play ===
When a player approaches the edge of a tile, the player lays a new tile down, and draws cards that represent the monsters, treasure and characters that inhabit that area of the city. The "Tome of Chaos" then provides a role-playing encounter keyed to that location, and the player must make choices based on the encounter, and solve puzzles that provide clues as to how to save the city.

== Reception ==
Paul Pettengale reviewed City of Chaos for Arcane magazine, rating it a 6 out of 10 overall, and stated that "City of Chaos is a great idea handicapped by a poor set of rules. The game components are of high quality, and it's still fun to play - but only after you've been through the lengthy process of creating your own set of house rules. Give it a go by all means, but don't expect it to be easy from the offset."

In the July 1997 edition of Dragon (Issue #237), Rick Swan liked the game's attempt to mix board game and role-playing game, saying the game "redefines the genre, effortlessly infusing a clever set of board game mechanics with the rich characterizations and plot twists of an RPG." Swan concluded, "An English import, City of Chaos may be hard to find, but it’s worth the hunt."

The reviewer from Pyramid #28 (Nov./Dec., 1997) stated that "City of Chaos is unlike any other board game I have ever played. It combines loose and fast board game elements with roleplaying elements to create a unique experience."
